The Byte is a small one-design sailing dinghy sailed by one person. It was designed by Canadian Ian Bruce, who also commissioned and marketed the Laser.

History

Design
The hull is composed of glass reinforced polyester and foam sandwich. The Byte is designed for sailors weighing  although most sailors weighing  should have no problems sailing this boat on a recreational basis. The Byte sail size is only  making it the ideal boat for those sailors who enjoy the independence and simplicity of a cat rigged boat, such as the Laser, but who are not strong or heavy enough to control a large sail.

The rigging is similar to that of the Laser except one noticeable difference. The traveler is just below the main sheet block and not at the stern of the boat (similar to a Finn or Europe dinghy). This eradicates the chance of the main sheet getting caught on the transom which is a common complaint of the Laser. The sail controls are also "split" and led to both side-decks, again somewhat like a Finn or Europe and allows for more technical adjustments.

The Portsmouth Yardstick handicap of a Byte is 1147. The alternative D-PN handicap rating is 97.4.

Byte CII
The Byte was updated in 2004 with the development of a fully battened sail and two piece carbon-fibre mast. This CII rig has a slightly larger sail made of mylar and similar in appearance to the 29er sails. The new rig is designed to be self-depowering and was a welcome update to the previous byte rig. The inspiration for the new rig and sail was to create an out-of-the-box, cost effective, women's and youth boat. These developments give a speed improvement reflected in the Byte CII's Portsmouth Yardstick of 1147  and D-PN of 91.4.

Fleets
Although the Byte class operates on numerous continents, its largest fleets in Canada, Singapore, Bermuda, Great Britain and Switzerland.

Events

Class World Championships

Youth Sailing World Championships
The Byte CII is one of two boats designated in the ISAF Regulations for use as the Girl's One Person Dinghy for the ISAF Youth Sailing World Championships. The other is the Laser Radial. The Byte CII has been used at two Youth World Championships, in Australia and Canada,

Youth Olympic Games
The Byte dinghy was used for both male and female competitors in the Youth Olympic Games during the first two events held in Singapore and Nanjing.

Builders
The Byte CII is produced by Zou Inter Marine, Qingdao, PRC. Zim Sailing, Rhode Island, USA. Hartley Boats, UK. Nautivela SRL, Milan Italy, Xtreme Sailing Products Singapore, Armada Boats, São Paulo, Brazil and by Performance Sailcraft Pty Ltd, Sydney, Australia

The long time Asia-Pacific Laser manufacturer Performance Sailcraft Australasia (PSA), after receiving permission from ISAF, acquired the Copyright and worldwide building and marketing rights to the single handed Byte and Byte CII dinghy in 2012.

References

External links
Byte Class Association
World Sailing Byte Microsite
Hartly Boats - Constructors specifications

Classes of World Sailing
Dinghies
Youth Olympic sailing classes
Two-person sailboats
Sailboat type designs by Canadian designers